A list of films produced in Argentina in 1992:

External links and references
 Argentine films of 1992 at the Internet Movie Database

1992
Argentine
Films